Pyhäjärvi is a lake located mostly in Finland. The southeastern part of the lake is located in Russia.

See also
 Niukkala

References

Lakes of the Republic of Karelia
LPyhajarvi
Finland–Russia border
International lakes of Europe
Lakes of Kitee
Lakes of Parikkala